A Girl Named Mahmoud (Bint Ismaha Maĥmood) is a 1975 Egyptian comedy film directed by Niasi Mustafa.

Samar Habib, author of Female Homosexuality in the Middle East: Histories and Representations, wrote that the film "exploits the genre of transvestism as comedy" and that "several homoerotic images can be presented safely and innocently to mainstream audiences" through a female character pretending to be a male. She explained that because no characters consciously desire those of the same sex and because Ĥamida is still a woman, the film puts the audience "at ease". Habib added that "the question of [whether homoeroticism is forbidden in religion] does not surface so much as the issues of cultural belief, perhaps because the two can sometimes be interchangeable."

Habib concluded that the film does not successfully thoroughly examine homoerotic desire and that the film "attempts to rationalize homosexuality as a form of transgenderism (women who desire other women must be essentially men)".

Plot
Ĥamida (Suhair Ramzi) is the daughter of an illiterate widower, al-Ĥag Firghalee. Firghalee attempts to prevent his daughter from studying at a university, so the medical student Ĥassan helps her. After Firghalee reveals he will marry Ĥamida to a boy she dislikes, Ĥassan has her disguise herself as a man, Mahmoud. Ĥassan and his friends lie to Firghalee, telling him they performed surgery to change Ĥamida into a man. Ĥamida's disguise has an effeminate appearance, and both male and female employees at Firghalee's furniture shop are attracted to "Mahmoud" and many conclude "he" is a homosexual.

Firghalee's father mistakenly believes that "Mahmoud" is a homosexual when he sees "him" kiss Hassan. He arranges to have Lawaĥith, a cabaret entertainer, meet "Mahmood" to set "his" sexuality straight, but "Mahmoud" is not attracted to women and is unwilling to sleep with Lawaĥith. One woman says that she has the child of "Mahmoud" and two women claim to be engaged to "Mahmoud". After a doctor mistakenly states "Mahmoud" is pregnant, Ĥamida reveals her true identity. She and Ĥassan marry.

Characters
Ĥamida, a young woman who disguises herself as Mahmoud - Suhair Ramzi
al-Ĥag Firghalee, an illiterate widower. After Ĥamida re-appears as a boy, Firghalee is overjoyed to have a son, as he had always wanted one. He tells others that Maĥmood is a formerly-estranged son.
Habib describes Firghalee as "simple" and "traditional".
Ĥassan, a medical student who is in his final year of his coursework. He lives in the same building as Ĥamida.
Waĥeed, a male whom Ĥamida dislikes. Firghalee tries to get her to marry him.
Lawaĥith, a cabaret entertainer
Souâd, an individual who desires a romance with "Mahmoud," but faints when "he" reveals himself to be a woman

References
 Habib, Samar. Female Homosexuality in the Middle East: Histories and Representations. Routledge, July 18, 2007. , 9780415956734.

Notes

External links

 

1975 films
Egyptian LGBT-related films
Cross-dressing in film